Opsariichthys pachycephalus is a species of ray-finned fish in the genus Opsariichthys endemic to Taiwan. It is one of the most common minnows of Taiwan, found in the entire western part of the island from sea level to 1200 m elevation. It is a small species reaching a maximum length of  TL.

Colonization history
Opsariichthys pachycephalus populations show strong genetic structuring between drainages and weak genetic structuring within drainages. It is suggested that the current population structuring reflects colonization from two glacial refugia, formed when the cooler climate during the last glacial period restricted this species to lower elevations: one on the land bridge that connected Taiwan to the Asian mainland, and the other one in the south, east of the Gaoping River. Further divergence may be due to founder effects, bottlenecks, and selection.

Reproduction
Opsariichthys pachycephalus show two peak spawning periods, one in spring (February–April) and the other one in summer (June–August), the former being the main one. During the courtship, males chase after one female, showing aggressive behaviours among the males. Only the winner of the male-male contests follow the female to spawn. After spawning, the male may return to the spawning site to chase away egg predators.

References

Opsariichthys
Endemic fauna of Taiwan
Freshwater fish of Taiwan
Fish described in 1868
Taxa named by Albert Günther